The Baglan electoral ward includes the communities of Baglan and Baglan Bay, in Neath Port Talbot county borough, Wales.  Baglan falls within the parliamentary constituency of Aberavon.

Baglan is bounded by the wards of Briton Ferry West and Briton Ferry East to the north; Bryn and Cwmavon and Port Talbot to the east; and Aberavon and Sandfields West to the south.

The Baglan ward can be divided roughly into three zones.  The industrial zone lies to the south west of the M4 Motorway at Baglan Bay on the site that was once occupied by a BP Chemical works.  It is now an industrial regeneration area.  The residential zone lies just to the northeast of the M4, consisting of Baglan village.  The far north and eastern portion of the ward consists of undeveloped grassland and woodland.

County council elections
The ward elects three county councillors to Neath Port Talbot County Borough Council. At the Neath Port Talbot local council elections on 4 May 2017, the results were:

On 3 May 2012 the Local Council elections were held.  The turnout was 40.42% and the results were:

References

Electoral wards of Neath Port Talbot